Roberto Sanchez may refer to:
Roberto Sánchez (hurdler) (born 1910), Mexican hurdler
Roberto Sánchez Vilella (1913–1997), Governor of the Commonwealth of Puerto Rico
Roberto Sánchez Ramos (born 1960), judge of the Court of Appeals and Attorney General of Puerto Rico 
Roberto Sanchez (fighter) (born 1986), American mixed martial artist
Roberto Sánchez (footballer) (born 1989), Spanish professional footballer
Roberto Sánchez Palomino, Peruvian psychologist and politician

See also
Roberto Sánchez Vilella School of Public Administration,  graduate school of the University of Puerto Rico
Sandro de América (1945–2010), Argentine singer and actor born Roberto Sánchez-Ocampo
Robert Sánchez (born 1997), Spanish professional footballer